Sean P. Leary is an American college baseball coach and former shortstop. He is the head baseball coach at Lehigh Mountain Hawks in Bethlehem, Pennsylvania. Leary played college baseball at Lehigh for coach Stan Schultz from 1990 to 1993.

Playing career
Leary graduated from Bethlehem Catholic High School in Bethlehem, Pennsylvania. Leary enrolled at Lehigh University, to play college baseball for the Lehigh Engineers baseball team. Leary became a starter as a senior in 1993, hitting a .296 with 1 homer run and 15 RBIs.

Coaching career
Leary was an assistant in 1995 for Lehigh under new head coach, Tom Morgan. With Morgan experiencing health issues during the 1996 season, which ultimately led to his death, Leary was named the interim head coach. After leading the Engineers to an 18–20–1 record in 1996, Leary was named the full-time head coach on December 12, 1996.

Leary lead the Mountain Hawks to a 28–28 record in 2006, tied for first place in the Patriot League. Leary was named the 2006 Patriot League Coach of the Year.

Leary engineered a 12-game turnaround from 2009 to 2010, leading to a second place Patriot League finish and being named the Patriot League Coach of the Year for the second time.

Head coaching record

See also
 List of current NCAA Division I baseball coaches

References

External links
Lehigh Mountain Hawks bio

Living people
Baseball shortstops
Bethlehem Catholic High School alumni
Lehigh Mountain Hawks baseball coaches
Lehigh Mountain Hawks baseball players
Year of birth missing (living people)